is a railway station in Karatsu, Saga Prefecture, Japan. It is operated by JR Kyushu and is on the Karatsu and Chikuhi lines. It is the main station of Karatsu City.

Lines
JR Kyushu
Chikuhi Line
Karatsu Line

Layout
It is an elevated station with two island platforms and four tracks.

Environs
Karatsu Castle
Maizuru Park
Hikiyama Exhibition Hall
Showa Bus Ōteguchi Bus Center
Saga Prefectural Karatsu Nishi High School

History
1898-12-01 – Opening

Adjacent stations

Passenger statistics
In fiscal 2016, the station was used by an average of 2,290 passengers daily (boarding passengers only), and it ranked 83rd among the busiest stations of JR Kyushu.

References

Karatsu Line
Chikuhi Line
Railway stations in Saga Prefecture
Stations of Kyushu Railway Company
Railway stations in Japan opened in 1898